David B. Allison (born 27 September 1948) is an English former football referee, who operated in the English Football League and Premier League. During his time on the List he was based in Lancaster and was by profession a teacher.

Career
He became a Football League linesman in 1977 and three years later achieved promotion to the referees' list at the age of thirty-one. He made steady progress in his early years but by the late 1980s was becoming a regular top division referee, often handling Lancashire derby games including those involving the big Manchester and Liverpool clubs.

He became one of the first Premier League referees in 1992,† shortly after taking charge of his most senior cup appointment - a League Cup semi-final first leg between Nottingham Forest and Tottenham Hotspur. His first match in that competition was the 4–1 home win by Middlesbrough against Leeds United at Ayresome Park on 28 August.

Over the next two years he handled a large number of matches in the new League. However, in 1994 the Premier League moved to a rather smaller list of officials who would handle its matches and he was not selected.

He reverted to exclusive duty in the Football League, where his appointments included the 1996 Division One play-off final between Leicester City and Crystal Palace, which he rated his most memorable match. He retired at the end of the following season (1996–97). In his seventeen years as a referee he controlled 463 matches in the Football and Premier Leagues.

He later became a Football League regional co-ordinator and referees' coach, before being appointed National Group Manager in charge of the 57 top referees for Professional Game Match Officials Limited on 10 August 2007.

David is also the Training Officer for the Lancaster & Morecambe Referees' Society

Personal life

David has two daughters, Penelope Anne and Lucy. He currently lives with his partner Sheila and has two step-grandchildren named Heather and Emma.
David was a much respected teacher of languages but he retired a few years back because of family reasons.

References

Print
Football League Handbooks, 1977–1979
Rothmans Football League Yearbooks, 1980–1997
†Bateson, Bill; Albert Sewell (1992). News of the World Football Annual 1992/93. Harper Collins, p45.

Internet

External links
David Allison Referee Statistics at soccerbase.com

1948 births
Living people
People from Lancaster, Lancashire
English football referees
English Football League referees
Premier League referees